Too Many Women may refer to:

God's Gift to Women, also known as Too Many Women, a 1931 British film directed by Michael Curtiz
Too Many Women (1929 film), an American film directed by Sam Newfield
Too Many Women (1932 film), an American film directed by Lloyd French and Robert A. McGowan
Too Many Women (1942 film), an American film directed by Bernard B. Ray
Too Many Women (novel), a 1947 detective novel by Rex Stout about Nero Wolfe